Lennoxamine is an isoindolobenzazepine alkaloid, originally isolated from the Chilean barberry, Berberis darwinii.

References 

Alkaloids
Lactams
Isoindolines
Benzodioxoles
Phenol ethers